Jean-François Du Resnel du Bellay, Cong.Orat (29 June 1692, Rouen –  25 February 1761, Paris), was a French ecclesiastic, writer and translator.

Works 
 Essai sur la Critique, poème traduit de l’anglois de M. Pope, avec un discours et des remarques (1730)
 Panégyrique de Saint Louis (1732)
 Essai sur l’homme, par M. Pope. Traduit de l’anglois (1737) Online text
 Les Principes de la morale et du goût en deux poëmes, traduits de l’Anglois de M. Pope (1737) Online text

1692 births
1761 deaths
Writers from Rouen
French Oratory
18th-century French writers
18th-century French male writers
Translators to French
Translators from English
18th-century French Roman Catholic priests
Members of the Académie Française
18th-century French translators
Clergy from Rouen